Vega flight VV15 was the  flight of the Vega launcher, and its first failure.

Payload 

FalconEye1 

Mission description

Launch date 
The launch, initially planned for 5 June 2019, was postponed several times due to unfavourable weather conditions. The  Vega flight finally lifted off from the ELV launch pad in Kourou, French Guiana on 11 July 2019 at 01:53:03 UTC (10 July 2019 at 22:53:03 local time).

Planned orbit 

Launch log 

FalconEye1 was Airbus Defence and Space's  and Thales Alenia Space  spacecraft to be launched by Arianespace.

Failure

Initial statements 
Only 9 minutes after liftoff, a first statement was read by Luce Fabreguettes, Arianespace's executive vice-president for missions, operations and purchasing, indicating that "[...] about 2 minutes after liftoff, around the Zefiro 23 (Z23) ignition, a major anomaly occurred, resulting in the loss of the mission. [...] From the first flight data analysis we will get in the coming hours more precise information, and we will communicate to everybody at the soonest. [...]".

Arianespace later repeated in a press release that "approximately two minutes after the Vega launcher’s liftoff, shortly after ignition of the second stage (Z23), a launcher anomaly occurred – leading to the premature end of the mission".

Avio also published the same press release and also a video by their CEO confirming the event: "Approximately two minutes after the Vega launcher’s liftoff, shortly after ignition of the second stage, a launcher anomaly occurred – leading to the premature end of the mission", and "At present, the cause of the anomaly is still unknown and is under investigation".

Inquiry commission 
On the day of the incident, Arianespace and ESA announced that an inquiry commission would be appointed to investigate the causes of the failure and to produce recommendations allowing the Vega launcher to resume safe operations. It has been co-chaired by ESA's inspector general, Toni Tolker-Nielsen, and Arianespace's chief technical officer, Roland Lagier, and also included representatives from CNES and Avio.

On 4 September 2019, the inquiry commission submitted its findings, that were released the next day on 5 September 2019. In particular, a structural failure on the second stage's forward dome area resulting from higher temperatures was identified as the most probable cause of the failure:

"The Commission identified as the most likely cause of the anomaly a thermo-structural failure in the forward dome area of the Z23 motor. Other possible causes such as inadvertent activation of the Z23 neutralization system have been found unlikely".
 
Furthermore, after specific investigations, the Independent Inquiry Commission did not find any evidence of a malicious act.

On 6 December 2019, Avio released its further findings, revealing that a thermal protection design flaw on the second stage's forward dome area was the root cause of this launch failure that allowed a hot gas leaking into the critical structural part of the forward dome area. Avio engineers were able to replicate the same failure mode with this launch failure. The issue was addressed though adding more thermal protection and taking other measures.

Chronology 
The recorded parameters streamed to ground controllers revealed that at T+00:02:10.850, shortly after ignition of the second stage's Zefiro 23 motor, a sudden and violent event occurred on the second stage that led to breaking up the launch vehicle into two main parts: the second stage and the rest of the vehicle. Beginning at T+00:02:15, the trajectory recorded veered off course. Knowing that the vehicle was in an unrecoverable condition, the range safety officer sent a destruct signal at T+00:03:33.660, which was confirmed as executed. At T+00:05:14.025, the telemetry was lost. Soon after the loss of telemetry, the vehicle crashed into the Atlantic Ocean.

Aftermath 
A set of corrective actions will be implemented by the rocket manufacturer to fix and reinforce the suspected part to prevent the repeat of the failure. Arianespace expected to resume Vega flight by late March 2020, almost nine months of hiatus. The maiden flight of upgraded Vega C would be in the second quarter of 2020.

But the return-to-flight was delayed several times. In June 2020, after being delayed from March 2020 due to COVID-19 pandemic, the launch was delayed again to mid-August 2020 due to unfavorable weather conditions and the need to recharge the satellites' batteries as the launch window in June had exhausted, making another launch campaign in the Guiana Space Centre, Ariane flight VA253, preceded this return-to-flight. Delayed again to 1 and then 2 September due to range conflict with delayed launch of VA253 resulting from a sensor problem on the Ariane 5 rocket. Delayed again by 24 hours due to Typhoon Maysak approaching the Jeju tracking station that was intended to acquire the rocket's telemetry. Finally, the return-to-flight was performed successfully on 3 September 2020 at the instantaneous launch window at 01:51:10 UTC, almost 14 months of hiatus. As a result, from the long delay, the maiden flight of upgraded Vega C would be the first half of 2021.

UAE Armed Forces announced the cancellation of subsequent FalconEye 2 satellite to be launched on a Vega rocket and ordered Arianespace to switch to a more expensive Soyuz rocket.

The failed launch of Falcon Eye 1 led to the highest recorded amount for a single insurance claim in history ($415 million) for a satellite launch failure.

References

External links 

 Vega Flight VV15 at Arianespace (Archived 29 June 2019)

Vega (rocket)
2019 in French Guiana
Rocket launches in 2019